Soulcraft the debut studio album of Thessalonians, released in October 1993 by Silent. The album has been described as musically stunning and groundbreaking.

Track listing

Personnel
Adapted from the Soulcraft liner notes.

Thessalonians
 Kim Cascone – sampler, effects, production, mixing
 Don Falcone – synthesizer
 David James – bass guitar, percussion, drum programming
 Larry Thrasher – tabla, percussion, sampler, shortwave radio
 Doug Murdock – percussion, congas
 Paul Neyrinck – computer, sampler, voice

Release history

References

External links 
 Soulcraft at Discogs (list of releases)

1993 debut albums
Thessalonians (band) albums